

Paul Albert Gordan (27 April 1837 – 21 December 1912) was a Jewish-German mathematician, a student of Carl Jacobi at the University of Königsberg before obtaining his PhD at the University of Breslau (1862), and a professor at the University of Erlangen-Nuremberg.

He was born in Breslau, Germany (now Wrocław, Poland), and died in Erlangen, Germany.

He was known as "the king of invariant theory". His most famous result is that the ring of invariants of binary forms of fixed degree is finitely generated. Clebsch–Gordan coefficients are named after him and Alfred Clebsch. Gordan also served as the thesis advisor for Emmy Noether.

A famous quote attributed to Gordan about David Hilbert's proof of Hilbert's basis theorem, a result which vastly generalized his result on invariants, is "This is not mathematics; this is theology." The proof in question was the (non-constructive) existence of a finite basis for invariants. It is not clear if Gordan really said this since the earliest reference to it is 25 years after the events and after his death.  Nor is it clear whether the quote was intended as criticism,  or praise, or a subtle joke. Gordan himself encouraged Hilbert and used Hilbert's results and methods, and the widespread story that he opposed Hilbert's work on invariant theory is a myth (though he did correctly point out in a referee's report that some of the reasoning in Hilbert's paper was incomplete).

Publications

Notes

See also
Dickson's lemma
Invariant of a binary form
Symbolic method

References
, available at DigiZeitschirften.
, available at DigiZeitschirften.

External links
 

1837 births
1912 deaths
19th-century German mathematicians
20th-century German mathematicians
19th-century German Jews
Algebraists
Scientists from Wrocław
People from the Province of Silesia
University of Breslau alumni
University of Königsberg alumni
Humboldt University of Berlin alumni
Academic staff of the University of Giessen
Academic staff of the University of Erlangen-Nuremberg